Highway 263 is a highway in the Canadian province of Saskatchewan. It runs from Highway 2 to Highway 264 in the Prince Albert National Park at Waskesiu Lake.

Most of Highway 263 lies within the Prince Albert National Park. The section that lies outside of the park passes near the village of Christopher Lake and the hamlets of Bell's Beach, Sunnyside Beach, Neis Beach, Emma Lake, 
and Tweedsmuir.

Highway 263 also connects with Highway 952 and also junctions with Highway 240 just inside the national park's boundaries.

Both inside and outside the national park, many recreational areas and camping sites are accessible from the highway.

References

263